is a Japanese light novel series written by Junpei Inuzuka, with illustrations by Katsumi Enami. Shufunotomo have released five volumes of the series since February 2015. An anime television series adaptation produced by Silver Link aired from July to September 2017. A second season by OLM aired from October to December 2021.

Plot 

The  is a restaurant situated in a mundane corner of an undisclosed Tokyo shopping district which offers a lot of Japanese versions of Western dishes. It opens during usual business hours but is closed during holidays and weekends; with its usual clientele being the working class of the city. But secretly it is also open on Saturdays, as on this particular day it creates doorways to another world inhabited by elves, dragons, beastmen and other fantastic creatures, who enter the restaurant and partake of its exotic food, with many of them becoming regular patrons. But while Nekoya mainly offers food, it is also a place where relationships are forged, inspirations made, and salvation for the needy is provided.

Media

Light novel 
The web novel was initially serialized by Junpei Inuzuka on the user-generated content site Shōsetsuka ni Narō from January 4, 2013, onwards. Following the web novel's publication, Shufunotomo acquired the series for print publication. The first light novel volume, with illustrations by Katsumi Enami, was published on February 28, 2015, under their Hero Bunko imprint. As of October 2021, six volumes have been published. Seven Seas Entertainment has licensed the novel.

Volume list

Manga 
A manga adaptation illustrated by Takaaki Kugatsu launched in Square Enix's Young Gangan magazine in November 2016 and ended in June 2019. The manga shares the same first chapter about menchikatsu as the original web novel, but the second chapter is different. Crunchyroll published the manga digitally in English beginning on July 2, 2017. The manga is also licensed by Yen Press.

A second manga adaptation by Morozawa Yamizawa titled  began serialization in Kadokawa Shoten's Monthly Shōnen Ace magazine on April 26, 2021.

Volume list

Anime 
The author reported in a September 7, 2016, blog entry on the Shōsetsuka ni Narō website that an anime adaptation project of the light novel series was in the works, later revealed to be an anime television series. The series aired from July 4 to September 19, 2017, on TV Tokyo, and was streamed with subtitles by Crunchyroll and with an English dub by Funimation. Masato Jinbo directed the series and supervised scripts at Silver Link, with Takao Sano and Keiichi Sano adapted the original character designs for animation.

On April 22, 2021, it was announced on the cover of the Monthly Shōnen Ace magazine's June 2021 issue that a second season had been greenlit for production. OLM will animate the second season, and Yasukazu Shoji will replace Keiichi Sano and Takao Sano as the character designer. The rest of the staff and cast members are returning to reprise their roles.  The second season aired from October 2 to December 18, 2021.  The opening theme is "Onnaji Kimochi" by Kiyono Yasuno, while the ending theme is "Samenai Mahō" by Nao Tōyama.

Episode list

Restaurant to Another World

Restaurant to Another World 2

Notes

References

External links 
 at Shōsetsuka ni Narō 
 

2017 anime television series debuts
2010s fantasy novels
2015 Japanese novels
Anime and manga based on light novels
Book series introduced in 2013
Cooking in anime and manga
Fictional restaurants
Funimation
Gangan Comics manga
Isekai anime and manga
Isekai novels and light novels
Japanese fantasy novels
Kadokawa Shoten manga
Light novels
Light novels first published online
OLM, Inc.
Seinen manga
Seven Seas Entertainment titles
Shōnen manga
Shōsetsuka ni Narō
Silver Link
Television shows based on light novels
TV Tokyo original programming
Yen Press titles